United Nations Security Council resolution 617, adopted unanimously on 29 July 1988, after recalling previous resolutions on the topic, as well as studying the report by the Secretary-General on the United Nations Interim Force in Lebanon (UNIFIL) approved in 426 (1978), the Council decided to extend the mandate of UNIFIL for a further six months until 31 January 1989.

The Council then emphasised the mandate of the Force and requested the Secretary-General to report back on the progress made with regard to the implementation of resolutions 425 (1978) and 426 (1978).

See also 
 Israeli–Lebanese conflict
 Lebanese Civil War
 List of United Nations Security Council Resolutions 601 to 700 (1987–1991)
 South Lebanon conflict (1985–2000)

References
Text of the Resolution at undocs.org

External links
 

 0617
 0617
Israeli–Lebanese conflict
1988 in Israel
1988 in Lebanon
 0617
July 1988 events